WEKT (1070 AM) is a radio station broadcasting a Southern gospel Christian radio format. Licensed to Elkton, Kentucky, United States.  The station is currently owned by M & R Broadcasting, Inc.

On March 24, 2016, WEKT was granted an FCC construction permit to increase day power to 1,000 watts.

History
The station signed on the air as WSRG on July 21, 1977, initially broadcasting a country music format under ownership of Jim White. It became known as WOAM on February 1, 1988 when country music singer Ernie Ashworth purchased the station. After the station was purchased by Marshall Sidebottom shortly after he sold WIRV of Irvine, WOAM officially became WEKT on January 3, 1989.

The station switched to its current Southern Gospel format at some time in the early 1990s.

Programming
In addition to southern gospel music, the station also broadcasts church services on Sundays. It is also the hone of football and basketball games of the Todd County Central High School athletic teams. 

National news updates are currently provided by the Salem Radio Network.

References

External links

WEKT-AM 1070 Website
WEKT-AM at FaithWeb

Radio stations established in 1977
EKT
Todd County, Kentucky
Southern Gospel radio stations in the United States
1977 establishments in Kentucky
Elkton, Kentucky